Melanochromis simulans is a species of cichlid endemic to Lake Malawi where it occurs in the Masinje Rocks and at Cape Ngombo.  This species can reach a length of  SL.  It can also be found in the aquarium trade.

References

simulans
Taxa named by David Henry Eccles
Fish described in 1973
Taxonomy articles created by Polbot